Garden Variety was an American post-hardcore band active in the 1990s. During their time together, the band created several 7-inch singles between 1991 and 1996 and two LPs: a self-titled album in 1993 and Knocking the Skill Level in 1994.

Band personnel
Anthony Roman - bass, vocals
Anthony Rizzo - guitar
Joe Gorelick - drums, backing vocals

Discography
New Guitar Parts (Garden Variety split with Jejune 7-inch) Montalban Hotel Records/BWR 1996
Binder (CMJ New Music Monthly - May 1995 comp) gern blandstein/cmj 1995
Stickler (Garden Variety split 7-inch) Cargo 1995
(Knocking The Skill Level) Cargo/Headhunter 1995
Parker (Garden Variety split with Dahlia Seed 7-inch) MintTone 1994
S/T (Garden Variety) Gern Blandsten 1993
Hedge (Garden Variety  7-inch) MintTone 1992
First demo tape recorded on Northern Blvd in Queens 1991

Other appearances
Garden Variety appeared on a SoundViews magazine CD compilation, and with Pavement and many others on the famous Homage Descendents tribute CD. They were interviewed by actress Janeane Garofalo on the 1995 "7-Up listen up" series (in studio interview and recordings), appeared on the Lookout Records compilation Punk Rock USA alongside Jawbreaker, appeared with Texas is the Reason, Quicksand and many more on the Anti Matter CD/vinyl compilation (as well as the Anti Matter book), and on several other VHS video compilations during 1995/1996. In 1996, Vogue magazine interviewed the band for its Spring 1996 issue.

Post break-up
Anthony Roman played with Rockets Red Glare and created the band Radio 4.

Anthony Rizzo played and recorded with members of The Bogmen in the band Vic Thrill and played guitar for Radio 4. He is currently playing in Little Embers and is the main composer for the IFC show "Maron".

Joe Gorelick played and recorded with Bluetip, Sugarhigh, The St. James Stars, Retisonic, Marah, and Red Hare.

American post-hardcore musical groups
Musical groups from Long Island
Musical groups disestablished in 1996